Serkan Kaya (born July 8, 1984) is a Turkish long-distance runner competing in marathon.

He earned a quota spot for 2016 Summer Olympics with his performance at the 2015 Frankfurt Marathon.

References

1984 births
People from Erzincan
Turkish male long-distance runners
Turkish mountain runners
Turkish male marathon runners
Living people
21st-century Turkish people